The Bârsa lui Bucur is a left tributary of the river Bârsa in Romania. Its source is in the eastern part of the Făgăraș Mountains. It flows into the Bârsa upstream from Zărnești.

References

Rivers of Romania
Rivers of Brașov County